The European Beach Handball tour is a club competition for Beach Handball teams from EHF.

External links
 Official website

European Handball Federation competitions
Beach handball competitions